Diamond Bus (North West) Ltd., trading as Diamond North West, is a bus operator providing services in the districts of Bolton and Wigan in Greater Manchester operating an extensive commercial network along with tendered services on behalf of Transport for Greater Manchester. It also serves some areas of the districts of Salford and Trafford. The company was founded as Green Triangle Buses and then subsequently renamed South Lancs Travel before being purchased by Rotala and rebranded as Diamond North West in 2015. In August 2019, Diamond North West purchased First Manchester's Bolton depot.

History

South Lancs Travel

Green Triangle Buses was established in April 1998 by Martin Bott and David Stewart. The new business began with two new Mercedes-Benz Varios which were used on a Greater Manchester Passenger Transport Executive tender. These were joined by three South Lancashire Transport (also owned by the two partners) single deckers for use on school services.

Further Varios were quickly added to the fleet, which were used on Green Triangle's first commercial service, route 675 a half-hourly service between Leigh and Shakerley via Astley and Tyldesley.

Less than a year later, route 675 was withdrawn and replaced with the 670/680 circular services. This essentially provided an extension to the existing service, running back to Leigh via Atherton. This was supplemented through the introduction of route 652 (Leigh - Hindley - Wigan). All three services directly competed against the incumbent operator, Bellairs & Dootson.

An opportunity for expansion came in 1998 with the opening of the Trafford Centre. Green Triangle introduced two new daytime services to the centre in the form of the 673 from Atherton and the 674 from Leigh. The 673 only lasted a short time, although the link was later reinstated as the 132; the 674 continues to this day, although it is now numbered 126.

In 1999 the business of Bellairs & Dootson was purchased. The combined operation was rebranded as South Lancs Travel. In 2000 the depot was relocated to its current premises.

Since then, the company has steadily expanded its network, primarily through tender gains. This expansion took the company deeper into both Wigan and Bolton, with the most significant gain being the award of the GMPTE Easylink network of services.

Commercial work was also added, with SLT taking over route 592 (between Shakerley and Bolton) in 2002, acquiring the service from the one-man Atherton Bus Company following the retirement of the owner. This was linked up with an existing service to form a through service from Leigh to Bolton.

The company also added a network of services in western Wigan in 2005, when it purchased Blue Bus of Bolton's Appley Bridge outstation. This included a small network of services to Shevington, Standish, Orrell and New Springs. The Appley Bridge outstation closed in May 2007.

In 2006 entrepreneur Julian Peddle bought a 30% stake in the company.

South Lancs Travel have also been involved in head-to-head competition with First Manchester on a number of occasions. The most notable of these took place in 2002, when, following competitive registrations by First, SLT offered "return tickets for the price of a single fare" - First responded with a £2.00 (later £2.50 then £3.00) weekly ticket for travel within the Leigh area.

First also introduced a short-lived competing 652 service, albeit operating from Hindley Green to Shakerley via Leigh. More recently, First introduced a competing 635 service - SLT retaliated by introducing journeys on the 600 between Wigan and Ashton-in-Makerfield, and offering a £1.00 flat fare. Following the withdrawal of First Greater Manchester services to Shevington, the SLT 600 was withdrawn in May 2008 and SLT is now the sole operator of services to Shevington and Appley Bridge.

On 30 September 2011, South Lancs Travel was sold to Julian Peddle and Crewe based D&G Bus. In January 2012, Strawberry merged with South Lancs Travel and moved its operations to SLT's depot in Atherton. Strawberry's founder Oliver Howarth became joint operations director of the enlarged company. However, he left soon after with Strawberry being acquired by D&G and Julian Peddle and merged into the main company and the name and livery being dropped in favour of the SLT brand.

On 1 March 2015, the business was sold to Rotala and rebranded Diamond Bus North West.

On 1 September 2017, Rotala purchased the bus operations of Go Goodwins, resulting in the acquisition of 18 buses and the Eccles depot on Old Wellington Road, Eccles. The existing Atherton depot subsequently closed. 

On 11 August 2019, First Greater Manchester's Bolton depot was taken over with 18 routes and 125 buses.

Services
As at March 2018, Diamond North West operated 83 routes. 

Following the decision by Greater Manchester Combined Authority to introduce franchises to the local bus network, in the first batch of franchises Diamond were awarded 7 of the 9 smaller franchises which are scheduled to commence in September 2023. However Go Ahead won the franchise for much of the current Diamond Bus North West network.

Fleet
As at August 2021, the fleet consisted of 252 buses.

Diamond North West has mainly standardised on the Wright StreetDeck double-decker bus following the acquisition of First's Bolton depot, taking delivery of 128 StreetDecks throughout 2020 and 2021 and purchasing others second-hand, including 13 StreetDecks from a cancelled First Leeds order, to replace buses being leased from the FirstGroup.

References

External links

Bus operators in Greater Manchester
Bus operators in Lancashire
Bus operators in Merseyside
Companies based in the Metropolitan Borough of Wigan
Rotala
Transport companies established in 1998
1998 establishments in England